Albertine may refer to:

Arts and entertainment
 Albertine (Krohg novel), an 1886 novel by Christian Krohg
 Albertine i politilægens venteværelse (Albertine at the Police Doctor's Waiting Room), an 1887 painting by Krohg 
 Albertine (Rose novel), a 2002 novel by Jacqueline Rose
 Albertine (album), a 2006 album by Brooke Fraser
 "Albertine" (song), a song from the album 
 Albertine Simonet, a character in Marcel Proust's novel In Search of Lost Time

People
 Albertin di Virga, 15th-century Venetian cartographer
 Albertine Necker de Saussure (1766–1841), Swiss writer and educationalist
 Albertine Sarrazin (1937–1967), French author
 Albertine Zullo (born 1967), professionally known simply as Albertine, Swiss illustrator
 Viv Albertine (born 1954), Australian-born British singer and songwriter
 Princess Elisabeth Albertine of Saxe-Hildburghausen (1713–1761)
 Albertine, Baroness Staël von Holstein (1797-1838)

Other uses
 Albertine Rift, the western branch of the East African Rift
 Albertine Brothers, a Catholic congregation of religious brothers 
 Albertine Wettins, a branch of the House of Wettin family
 Albertine, a French nickname for the Royal Library of Belgium

See also
Albert (disambiguation)
Albertina (disambiguation)
Albertine Statute, the constitution that Charles Albert of Sardinia conceded to the Kingdom of Sardinia in Italy in 1848